The David Niven Show is an American half-hour television anthology series that was broadcast from April 7 until July 7, 1959.

Premise
This series is an anthology series hosted by David Niven.

Cast
David Niven as host

Episodes

Guest stars
Eddie Albert
Jacques Bergerac
Eddie Bracken
Joanne Dru
Dan Duryea
Anne Francis
Carolyn Jones
Julie London
Frank Lovejoy
Cameron Mitchell
Susan Oliver
Fay Wray

Home video
In April 2014, 12 of the 13 episodes produced were released in a 2-DVD set by Simply Media in the UK. "Episode 9, "Maggie Malone", is missing.

References

External links
IMDb
TV.com
TV Guide
The David Niven Show at CVTA

1959 American television series debuts
1959 American television series endings
1950s American drama television series
Black-and-white American television shows
English-language television shows
NBC original programming
Television series by 20th Century Fox Television
Television series by Four Star Television